Adeixis griseata (swamp looper) is a species of moth of the family Geometridae. It is endemic to New Zealand.

Taxonomy 
This species was first described by George Vernon Hudson in 1903 from a specimen collected by Alfred Philpott at Seaward Moss in Southland. There was some debate between taxonomists as to whether this species was distinct from the Australian species Adeixis inostentata. However, in 1920, after comparing specimens of both species, Philpott concluded it was distinct enough to be regarded as its own species.

Description

Hudson regarded this species as being extremely variable in the intensity of its markings and the depth of its colouring. The forewings of A. griseata are silver grey in colour with a small disk-shaped dot as well as with dark brown or blackish triangular shaped shading from the middle of the base of the forewing to its apex and a much smaller brown triangular shaped shading below this. The hind-wings are grey coloured tinged with yellow brown. When at rest its body position tends to be head downward.

Range

Specimens have been collected not only at Seaward Downs but also in other locations in the South Island such as Lake Manapouri, as well as localities in the North Island such as in Whangarei, Waimarino, Raetihi, Ohakuni and Kaitoki. A. griseata has also been found on the Chatham Islands.

Habitat

A. griseata tends to inhabit poorly drained or swampy areas with sedges, rushes, Gleichenia, and native shrubs such as Pittosporum and Coprosma. However at present the host plant species of A. griseata is unknown.

References

External links
 Citizen science observations of A. griseata
 Specimens held at the Auckland War Memorial Museum

Oenochrominae
Moths described in 1903
Moths of New Zealand
Endemic fauna of New Zealand
Endemic moths of New Zealand